This is a list of film series that have four entries.

0-9

 3 Ninjas
 3 Ninjas (1992)
 3 Ninjas Kick Back (1994)
 3 Ninjas Knuckle Up (1995)
 3 Ninjas: High Noon at Mega Mountain (1998)
 1920
 1920 (2008)
 1920: Evil Returns (2012)
 1920 London (2016)
 1921 (2018)

A

Abbott and Costello Meet the Universal Monsters
Abbott and Costello Meet Frankenstein (1948)
Abbott and Costello Meet the Invisible Man (1951)
Abbott and Costello Meet Dr. Jekyll and Mr. Hyde (1953)
Abbott and Costello Meet the Mummy (1955)
Adémaï

 (1934)
 (1934)
 (1943)
Adémaï au poteau-frontière (1950)
Ah Boys to Men
Ah Boys to Men (2012)
Ah Boys to Men 2 (2013)
Ah Boys to Men 3: Frogmen (2015)
Ah Boys to Men 4 (2017)
Airport
Airport (1970)
Airport 1975 (1975)
Airport '77 (1977)
The Concorde ... Airport '79 (1979
Alan O'Connor and Bobbie Reynolds
Yellow Cargo (1936)
Navy Spy (1937)
The Gold Racket (1937)
Bank Alarm (1937)
All Grown Up! *
All Growed Up (2001) (TV)
All Grown Up! - Interview With a Campfire (2004) (TV)
All Grown Up! - Dude, Where's My Horse? (2005) (TV)
All Grown Up! - R.V. Having Fun Yet? (2006) (TV)
Alvin and the Chipmunks
Alvin and the Chipmunks (2007)
Alvin and the Chipmunks: The Squeakquel (2009)
Alvin and the Chipmunks: Chipwrecked (2011)
Alvin and the Chipmunks: The Road Chip (2015)
An American Tail *
An American Tail (1986)
An American Tail: Fievel Goes West (1991)
An American Tail: The Treasure of Manhattan Island (1998) (V)
An American Tail: The Mystery of the Night Monster (2000) (V)
Anak ni Waray *
Waray-waray (1954) 
Handang matodas (1956) 
Anak ni Waray (1958) 
Anak ni Waray vs Anak ni Biday (1984)
Angel
Angel (1984)
Avenging Angel (1985)
Angel III: The Final Chapter (1988)
Angel 4: Undercover (1993)
Animation Celebration
Animation Celebration (1986)
The 2nd Animation Celebration: The Movie (1990)
The Third Animation Celebration: The Movie (1991)
The 4th Animation Celebration: The Movie (1992) 
Anne of Green Gables *
Anne of Green Gables (1985) (TV)
Anne of Avonlea (1987) (TV)
Anne of Green Gables: The Continuing Story (2000) (TV)
Anne of Green Gables: A New Beginning (2008) (TV) (prequel)
Apocalypse
Apocalypse (1998)
Apocalypse II: Revelation (1999)
Apocalypse III: Tribulation (2000)
Apocalypse IV: Judgment (2001)
Ator l'invincibile
Ator l'invincible (1982)
Ator 2 - L'invincibile Orion (1984)
Iron Warrior (1987)
Quest for the Mighty Sword (1990)

B

 Barbershop
 Barbershop (2002)
 Barbershop 2: Back in Business (2004)
 Beauty Shop (2005) (spin-off)
 Barbershop: The Next Cut (2016)
Batman (Tim Burton and Joel Schumacher series)
Batman (1989)
Batman Returns (1992)
Batman Forever (1995)
Batman & Robin (1997)
 Behind Enemy Lines
 Behind Enemy Lines (2001)
 Behind Enemy Lines II: Axis of Evil (2006) (V)
 Behind Enemy Lines: Colombia (2009) (V)
 SEAL Team 8: Behind Enemy Lines (2014) (V)
Best of the Best
Best of the Best (1989)
Best of the Best 2 (1993)
Best of the Best 3: No Turning Back (1996) (V)
Best of the Best 4: Without Warning (1998) (V)
Big Town
I Cover Big Town (1947)
Big Town (1947)
Big Town After Dark (1947)
Big Town Scandal (1948)
Billy Jack
The Born Losers (1967)
Billy Jack (1971)
The Trial of Billy Jack (1974)
Billy Jack Goes to Washington (1977)
Bionicle * (A)
Bionicle: Mask of Light (2003) (V)
Bionicle 2: Legends of Metru Nui (2004) (V)
Bionicle 3: Web of Shadows (2005) (V)
Bionicle: The Legend Reborn (2009) (V)
Black Cobra
Black Cobra (1987)
Black Cobra 2 (1988)
Black Cobra 3: Manila Connection (1990)
Black Cobra 4: Detective Malone (1990)
Bleach *
Bleach: Memories of Nobody (2006)
Bleach: The DiamondDust Rebellion (2007)
Bleach: Fade to Black (2008)
Bleach: Hell Verse (2010)
Blood
Brides of Blood (1968) 
Mad Doctor of Blood Island (1968)
Beast of Blood (1971)
Brain of Blood (1972)
Bloodsport
Bloodsport (1988) (V)
Bloodsport II: The Next Kumite (1996) (V)
Bloodsport III (1997) (V)
Bloodsport 4: The Dark Kumite (1999) (V)
Boa vs. Python
Python (2000) (TV)
New Alcatraz (2002) (TV)
Pythons 2 (2002) (TV)
Boa vs. Python (2004) (TV)
The Brave Archer
The Brave Archer (1977)
The Brave Archer 2 (1978)
The Brave Archer 3 (1981) (a.k.a. Blast of the Iron Palm)
The Brave Archer and His Mate (1982) (a.k.a. Mysterious Island)
Brenner
Komm, süßer Tod (2000)
Silentium (2004)
The Bone Man (2009)
Life Eternal (2015)
Broadway Melody
The Broadway Melody (1929) 
Broadway Melody of 1936 (1935) 
Broadway Melody of 1938 (1937) 
Broadway Melody of 1940 (1940)

C

The Calcutta Trilogy (Satyajit Ray)
Pratidwandi (The Adversary) (1971)
Seemabaddha (Company Limited) (1971)
Jana Aranya (The Middleman) (1976)
Within the Woods (2005) (V)
Candyman 
Candyman (1992)
Candyman: Farewell to the Flesh (1995)
Candyman: Day of the Dead (1999)
Candyman (2021)
Critters *
Critters (1986)
Critters 2: The Main Course (1988)
Critters 3 (1991) (V)
Critters 4 (1992) (V)
CBI
Oru CBI Diary Kurippu (1988) 
Jagratha (1989) 
Sethurama Iyer CBI (2004) 
Nerariyan CBI (2005)
ChalkZone *
ChalkZone - Double Trouble (2004) (TV)
ChalkZone - The Big Blow Up (2004) (TV)
ChalkZone - When Santas Collide (2004) (TV)
ChalkZone - The Art of Sucker Punch (2009) (TV)
CID 999
Jedara Bale (1968) 
Goa Dalli CID 999 (1968) 
Operation Jackpot Nalli C.I.D 999 (1969) 
Operation Diamond Racket (1978)
The Cheerleaders
The Cheerleaders (1973)
The Swinging Cheerleaders (1974)
Revenge of the Cheerleaders (1976)
The Great American Girl Robbery (1979) (a.k.a. Cheerleaders Wild Weekend)
CKY
CKY (1999) (V) (a.k.a. Landspeed presents: CKY)
CKY2K (2000) (V)
CKY 3 (2001) (V)
CKY4: The Latest & Greatest  (2002) (V)
Class Of Nuke 'Em High
Class of Nuke 'Em High (1986)
Class of Nuke 'Em High Part 2: Subhumanoid Meltdown (1991)
The Good, the Bad and the Subhumanoid: Class of Nuke 'Em High Part 3 (1994)
Return to Nuke 'Em High Volume 1 (2013)
Colonnello Rambaldo Buttiglione
 (1973) 
 (1974)
 (1975) 
 (1977)
Confessions
Confessions of a Window Cleaner (1974)
Confessions of a Pop Performer (1975)
Confessions of a Driving Instructor (1976)
Confessions from a Holiday Camp (1977)
Contes des quatre saisons
Conte de printemps (1990)
Conte d'hiver (1992)
Conte d'été (1996)
Conte d'automne (1998)
Cool School
Cool School (2007)
Cool School Camp (2009)
 (2014)
 (2015)
Cop *
Singham (2011)
Singham Returns (2015)
Simmba (2018)
Sooryavanshi (2020)
Cowgirls n' Angels
Cowgirls n' Angels (2012)
Cowgirls n' Angels: Dakota's Summer (2014)
A Cowgirl's Story (2017)
A Cowgirl's Song (2022)
The Crow *
The Crow (1994)
The Crow: City of Angels (1996)
The Crow: Salvation (2000) (V)
The Crow: Wicked Prayer (2005)
A Cry in the Wild/White Wolves
A Cry in the Wild (1990)
White Wolves: A Cry in the Wild II (1993)
White Wolves II: Legend of the Wild (1995)
White Wolves III: Cry of the White Wolf (2000)
 The Cutting Edge
 The Cutting Edge (1992)
 The Cutting Edge: Going for the Gold (2006) (TV)
 The Cutting Edge: Chasing the Dream (2008) (TV)
 The Cutting Edge: Fire and Ice (2010) (TV)

D

Dad and Dave (1932 series) *
On Our Selection (1932) 
Grandad Rudd (1935) 
Dad and Dave Come to Town (1938)
Dad Rudd, M.P. (1940)
Danny Phantom *
Danny Phantom - Reign Storm (2005) (TV)
Danny Phantom - The Ultimate Enemy (2005) (TV) 
Danny Phantom - Reality Trip (2006) (TV)
Danny Phantom - Phantom Planet (2007) (TV)
The Dark Wind
The Dark Wind (1991) 
Skinwalkers (2002) (TV)
Coyote Waits (2003) (TV)
A Thief of Time (2004) (TV)
Death Note
 Death Note (2006)
 Death Note: The Last Name (2007)
 L: Change the World (2008)
 Death Note: Light Up the New World (2016)
Death Race
Death Race (2008)
Death Race 2 (2011) (V) (prequel)
Death Race 3: Inferno (2013) (V) (prequel)
Death Race: Beyond Anarchy (2018) (V) 
Deathstalker
Deathstalker (1983) 
Deathstalker II (1987) (V) 
Deathstalker and the Warriors from Hell (1988) (V) 
Deathstalker IV: Match of Titans (1990) (V)
Demons
Dèmoni (1985) (a.k.a. Demons)
Dèmoni 2 (1986) (a.k.a. Demons 2)
Dèmoni 3 (1991) (a.k.a. Demons 3, Black Demons, The Church)
Cemetery Man (1994) (a.k.a. Dellamorte Dellamore, Demons '95) (unofficial)
Dennis the Menace (Live-action series) ***
Dennis the Menace: Dinosaur Hunter (1987) (TV)
Dennis the Menace (1993)
Dennis the Menace Strikes Again (1998) (V)
A Dennis the Menace Christmas (2007) (V)
Department Q
 The Keeper of Lost Causes (2013)
 The Absent One (2014)
 A Conspiracy of Faith (2016)
 The Purity of Vengeance (2018)
Diary of a Wimpy Kid
 Diary of a Wimpy Kid (2010)
 Diary of a Wimpy Kid: Rodrick Rules (2011)
 Diary of a Wimpy Kid: Dog Days (2012)
 Diary of a Wimpy Kid: The Long Haul (2017)
Dick Tracy (serials)
Dick Tracy (1937)
Dick Tracy Returns (1938)
Dick Tracy's G-Men (1939)
Dick Tracy vs. Crime, Inc. (1941)
Dick Tracy
Dick Tracy (1945)
Dick Tracy vs. Cueball (1946)
Dick Tracy's Dilemma (1947)
Dick Tracy Meets Gruesome (1947)
The Dirty Dozen *
The Dirty Dozen (1967)
The Dirty Dozen: Next Mission (1985) (TV)
The Dirty Dozen: The Deadly Mission (1987) (TV)
The Dirty Dozen: The Fatal Mission (1988) (TV)
Disney's DuckTales **
Disney's DuckTales: The Treasure of the Golden Suns (1987) (TV)
Disney's DuckTales: Time Is Money (1988) (TV)
Super DuckTales (1989) (TV)
DuckTales the Movie: Treasure of the Lost Lamp (1990)
Disney's Recess - Created by Paul & Joe *
Recess: School's Out (2001)
Recess Christmas: Miracle on Third Street (2001) (V)
Recess: Taking the Fifth Grade (2003) (V)
Recess: All Growed Down (2004) (V)
The Doberman Gang
The Doberman Gang (1972)
The Daring Dobermans (1973) 
The Amazing Dobermans (1976) 
Alex and the Doberman Gang (1980) (TV)
Dolai
Dolai (1985)
Dolai 2 (1986) 
Dolai 3 (1987) 
Dolai 4: Dune Buggy (1988)
The Donald Stachey Mysteries
Third Man Out (2005)(TV)
Shock to the System (2006)(TV)
On the Other Hand, Death (2008)(TV)
Ice Blues (2009) (TV)
Ducoboo
Ducoboo (2011)
 (2012)
Ducoboo 3.0 (2020)
 (2022)

E
 

Die Hochzeitsplanerin (2015) (TV)
Wolken über Kapstadt (2015) (TV)
Verliebt, verlobt, verboten (2015) (TV)
Die zweite Chance (2016) (TV)
Enteng Kabisote: Okay ka, Fairy Ko *
The Legend (2004)
The Legend Continues (2005)
The Legend Goes On and On and On (2006)
The Beginning of the Legend (2007)
The Expendables
The Expendables (2010)
The Expendables 2 (2012)
The Expendables 3 (2014)
The Expendables 4 (2023)

F

Female Convict Scorpion
Female Convict 701: Scorpion (1972)
Female Convict Scorpion: Jailhouse 41 (1972)
Female Prisoner Scorpion: Beast Stable (1973)
Female Convict Scorpion: Grudge Song (1973)
Fibber McGee and Molly *
Look Who's Laughing (1941)
Here We Go Again (1942)
Heavenly Days (1944)
Comin' Round the Mountain (1940) (spin-off)
Fist of Fury
Fist of Fury (1972)
New Fist of Fury (1976)
Fist of Fury II (1976)
Fist of Fury III (1980)
Frosty the Snowman (A)
Frosty the Snowman (1969) (TV)
Frosty's Winter Wonderland (1976) (TV)
Rudolph and Frosty's Christmas in July (1979) (TV)
Frosty Returns (1992) (TV)
Franklin (A) *
Franklin and the Green Knight (2000)
Franklin's Magic Christmas (2001)
Back to School with Franklin (2003)
Franklin and the Turtle Lake Treasure (2006)
Four Daughters
Four Daughters (1938)
Daughters Courageous (1939)
Four Wives (1940)
Four Mothers (1941)
Futurama * (A)
Futurama: Bender's Big Score (2008) (V)
Futurama: The Beast with a Billion Backs (2008) (V)
Futurama: Bender's Game (2008) (V)
Futurama: Into the Wild Green Yonder (2009) (V)

G
 
Gakko no Kaidan
Gakko no Kaidan (1995)
Gakkō no Kaidan 2 (1996)
Gakko no Kaidan 3 (1997)
Gakko no Kaidan 4 (1999)
Gangster
Satya (1998)
Company (2002)
D (2005)
Satya 2 (2013)
Ghoulies
Ghoulies (1985)
Ghoulies II (1987) (V)
Ghoulies III: Ghoulies Go to College (1991) (V)
Ghoulies IV (1994) (V)
God's Not Dead
God's Not Dead (2014)
God's Not Dead 2: He's Surely Alive (2016)
God's Not Dead: A Light in Darkness (2018)
God's Not Dead: We the People (2021)
Gold Diggers 
Gold Diggers of 1933 (1933) 
Gold Diggers of 1935 (1935) 
Gold Diggers of 1937 (1936) 
Gold Diggers in Paris (1938)
Golmaal
Golmaal (2006)
Golmaal Returns (2008)
Golmaal 3 (2010)
Golmaal Again (2017)
La gran familia
La gran familia (1962) 
La familia y... uno más (1965) 
La familia, bien, gracias (1979) 
La familia... 30 años después (1999) (TV)
The Great Gildersleeve *
The Great Gildersleeve (1942)
Gildersleeve's Bad Day (1943) 
Gildersleeve on Broadway (1943) 
Gildersleeve's Ghost (1944)
Gourmet Detective
The Gourmet Detective (2015) (TV)
A Healthy Place to Die (2015) (TV)
Death Al Dente (2016) (TV)
Eat, Drink & Be Buried (2017) (TV)
The Grim Adventures of Billy & Mandy **
Billy & Mandy's Big Boogey Adventure (2007) (TV)
Billy & Mandy: Wrath of the Spider Queen (2007) (TV)
The Grim Adventures of the Kids Next Door (2007) (TV)
Underfist: Halloween Bash (2008) (TV)
The Grudge
The Grudge (2004)
The Grudge 2 (2006)
The Grudge 3 (2009) (V)
The Grudge (2020)
Godzilla **** Reiwa era (2016–present)
Shin Godzilla (2016) 
Godzilla: Planet of the Monsters (2017) (A)
Godzilla: City on the Edge of Battle (2018) (A)
Godzilla: The Planet Eater (2018) (A)

H
 
Hannibal Lecter *
The Silence of the Lambs (1991)
Hannibal (2001)
Red Dragon (2002) (prequel)
Hannibal Rising (2007) (prequel)
Halloweentown
Halloweentown (1998) (TV)
Halloweentown II: Kalabar's Revenge (2001) (TV)
Halloweentown High (2004) (TV)
Return to Halloweentown (2006) (TV)
Hatchet
Hatchet (2006)
Hatchet II (2010)
Hatchet III (2013)
Victor Crowley (2017)
Hate Story
Hate Story (2012)
Hate Story 2 (2014)
Hate Story 3 (2015)
Hate Story 4 (2018)
Hell Comes to Frogtown
Hell Comes to Frogtown (1987)
Return to Frogtown (1993)
Toad Warrior (1996)
Max Hell Frog Warrior (2002)
High School Musical
High School Musical (2006) (TV)
High School Musical 2 (2007) (TV)
High School Musical 3: Senior Year (2008)
Sharpay's Fabulous Adventure (2011) (TV) (spin-off) 

Honey
Honey (2003)
Honey 2 (2011)
Honey 3: Dare to Dance (2016) (V) 
Honey: Rise Up and Dance (2018) (V)
Hot Wheels AcceleRacers
Hot Wheels: AcceleRacers – Ignition (2005) (TV) 
Hot Wheels: AcceleRacers – The Speed of Silence (2005) (TV)
Hot Wheels: AcceleRacers – Breaking Point (2005) (TV) 
Hot Wheels: AcceleRacers – The Ultimate Race (2005) (TV)
Hotel Transylvania * (A)
Hotel Transylvania (2012)
Hotel Transylvania 2 (2015)
Hotel Transylvania 3: Summer Vacation (2018)
Hotel Transylvania: Transformania (2022)
 House
House (1985)
House II: The Second Story (1987)
The Horror Show (1989)
House IV (1992)
Housefull
 Housefull (2010)
 Housefull 2 (2012)
 Housefull 3 (2016)
 Housefull 4 (2019)
The Hunger Games
The Hunger Games (2012)
The Hunger Games: Catching Fire (2013)
The Hunger Games: Mockingjay – Part 1 (2014)
The Hunger Games: Mockingjay – Part 2 (2015)
Hunter *
Hunter (1984) (TV)
The Return of Hunter: Everyone Walks in L.A. (1995) (TV)
Hunter: Return to Justice (2002) (TV)
Hunter: Back in Force (2003) (TV)

I

iCarly *
iCarly: iGo to Japan (2008) (TV)
iCarly: iDate a Bad Boy (2009) (TV)
iCarly: iFight Shelby Marx (2009) (TV)
iCarly: iQuit iCarly (2009) (TV)
Ilsa: She-Wolf of the SS
Ilsa, She Wolf of the SS (1975)
Ilsa, Harem Keeper of the Oil Sheiks (1976)
Ilsa, the Wicked Warden (1977)
Ilsa, the Tigress of Siberia (1977)
Imperium
Imperium: Augustus (2003) 
Imperium: Nero (2004)
Imperium: Saint Peter (2005)
Imperium: Pompeii (2006)
Ingmarssönerna
Ingmarssönerna (1919) 
Karin Ingmarsdotter (1920) 
Ingmarsarvet (1925) 
Till österland (1926)
Inspector Gadget ****
The Amazing Adventures of Inspector Gadget (1986) (V) 
Inspector Gadget: Gadget's Greatest Gadgets (1999) (V) 
Inspector Gadget's Last Case: Claw's Revenge (2002) (TV) 
Inspector Gadget's Biggest Caper Ever: The Case Of The Giant Flying Lizard (2005) (V)
Inspector Grey
 (1936)
 (1937)
 (1937)
 (1940)
The Inspector Wears Skirts
The Inspector Wears Skirts (1988)
The Inspector Wears Skirts II (1989) 
The Inspector Wears Skirts III (1990) 
The Inspector Wears Skirts IV (1992)
Insidious
 Insidious (2010)
 Insidious: Chapter 2 (2013)
 Insidious: Chapter 3 (2015) (prequel)
 Insidious: The Last Key (2018) (prequel)
Inuyasha *
Affections Touching Across Time (2001)
The Castle Beyond the Looking Glass (2002)
Swords of an Honorable Ruler (2003)
Fire on the Mystic Island (2004)
Iron Eagle
Iron Eagle (1986) 
Iron Eagle II (1988) 
Aces: Iron Eagle III (1992) 
Iron Eagle on the Attack (1995) (V)
Ironside *
Ironside (1967) (TV) (Pilot of the TV series)
Split Second to an Epitaph (1968) (TV)
The Priest Killer (1971) (TV)
The Return of Ironside (1993) (TV)
It's a Mad, Mad, Mad World
It's a Mad, Mad, Mad World (1987)
It's a Mad, Mad, Mad World 2 (1988) 
It's a Mad, Mad, Mad World 3 (1989) 
It's a Mad, Mad, Mad World 4 (1992)

J

 Janne Vängman
  (1948) 
  (1949) 
  (1952) 
  (1955)
 Jarhead
 Jarhead (2005)
 Jarhead 2: Field of Fire (2014) (V)
 Jarhead 3: The Siege (2016) (V)
 Jarhead: Law of Return (2019) (V)
 Jaws
 Jaws (1975)
 Jaws 2 (1978)
 Jaws 3-D (1983)
 Jaws: The Revenge (1987)
 Jeepers Creepers
 Jeepers Creepers (2001)
 Jeepers Creepers 2 (2003)
 Jeepers Creepers 3 (2017)
 Jeepers Creepers: Reborn (2022)
 The Jetsons *
 The Jetsons Meet the Flintstones (1987) (TV)
 Rockin' with Judy Jetson (1988) (TV)
 Jetsons: The Movie (1990)
 The Jetsons & WWE: Robo-WrestleMania! (2017) (V)
 Journey to the Unknown *
 Journey Into Darkness (1968) (TV)
 Journey to Midnight (1968) (TV)
 Journey to the Unknown (1969) (TV)
 Journey to Murder (1971) (TV)
 Jumanji
 Jumanji (1995)
 Zathura: A Space Adventure (2005)
 Jumanji: Welcome to the Jungle (2017)
 Jumanji: The Next Level (2019)

K
 
K-9
K-9 (1989)
K-9000 (1991) (TV) (spin-off)
K-911 (1999) (V)
K-9: P.I. (2002) (V)
The Karate Kid **
The Karate Kid (1984)
The Karate Kid Part II (1986)
The Karate Kid Part III (1989)
The Next Karate Kid (1994)
Killer Tomatoes! *
Attack of the Killer Tomatoes (1978)
Return of the Killer Tomatoes (1988)
Killer Tomatoes Strike Back (1990) (V)
Killer Tomatoes Eat France (1991) (V)
Killjoy
Killjoy (2000) (V)
Killjoy 2: Deliverance from Evil (2002) (V)
Killjoy 3 (2010) (V)
Killjoy Goes to Hell (2012) (V)
Kolchak: The Night Stalker **
The Night Stalker (1972) (TV)
The Night Strangler (1972) (TV)
Crackle of Death (1976) (TV)
The Demon and the Mummy (1976) (TV)
Komisario Palmu
Komisario Palmun erehdys (1960) 
Kaasua, komisario Palmu! (1961) 
Tähdet kertovat, komisario Palmu (1962) 
Vodkaa, komisario Palmu (1969)
Krummerne * 
 (1991)
 (1992)  
 (1994) 
 (2006)

L

La poliziotta
La poliziotta (1974)
La poliziotta fa carriera (1975) 
La poliziotta della squadra del buon costume (1979)
La poliziotta a New York (1981)
Legally Blonde
Legally Blonde (2001)
Legally Blonde 2: Red, White & Blonde (2003) 
Legally Blondes (2009) (V) (spin-off)
Legally Blonde 3 (2022)
The Lego Movie
The Lego Movie (2014)
The Lego Batman Movie (2017) (spin-off)
The Lego Ninjago Movie (2017) (spin-off)
The Lego Movie 2: The Second Part (2019)
Lethal Weapon
Lethal Weapon (1987)
Lethal Weapon 2 (1989)
Lethal Weapon 3 (1992)
Lethal Weapon 4 (1998)
Le Tre Rose di Eva 
Le Tre Rose di Eva (2012)
Le Tre Rose di Eva 2 (2013) 
Le Tre Rose di Eva 3 (2015)
Le Tre Rose di Eva 4 (2017) 
Levy and Company
Levy and Company (1930)
The Levy Department Stores (1932)
Moïse et Salomon parfumeurs (1935)
Les Mariages de Mademoiselle Lévy (1936)
Lieutenant 'Brass' Bancroft
Secret Service of the Air (1939) 
Code of the Secret Service (1939) 
Smashing the Money Ring (1939) 
Murder in the Air (1940)
Lilla Jönssonligan
Lilla Jönssonligan och cornflakeskuppen (1996)
Lilla Jönssonligan på styva linan (1997)
Lilla Jönssonligan på kollo (2004)
Lilla Jönssonligan och stjärnkuppen (2006)
Lille Fridolf
 (1956) 
 (1957) 
 (1958) 
 (1959)
Lilo & Stitch *** (A)
Lilo & Stitch (2002)
Stitch! The Movie (2003) (V)
Lilo & Stitch 2: Stitch Has a Glitch (2005) (V) 
Leroy & Stitch (2006) (TV)
The Lion King ** (A)
The Lion King (1994)
The Lion King II: Simba's Pride (1998) (V)
The Lion King 1½ (2004) (V) (spin-off)
The Lion Guard: Return of the Roar (2015) (TV)
Loafing and Camouflage
Loafing and Camouflage (1984)
BIOS kai Politeia (1987)
Loafing and Camouflage: Sirens in the Aegean (2005)
Loafing and Camouflage: I4 (2008)
Lucky Luke * (A)
Daisy Town (1971)
The Ballad of the Daltons (1978)
The Daltons on the Loose (1983)
Go West: A Lucky Luke Adventure (2007)
Lux, König der Abenteurer
Lux, King of Criminals (1929)
The Man in the Dark (1930)  
Pariser Unterwelt (1930) 
Zweimal Lux (1930)

M

Mad Max
Mad Max (1979)
Mad Max 2: The Road Warrior (1981)
Mad Max Beyond Thunderdome (1985)
Mad Max: Fury Road (2015)
Madagascar ** (A)
Madagascar (2005)
Madagascar: Escape 2 Africa (2008)
Madagascar 3: Europe's Most Wanted (2012)
Penguins of Madagascar (2014) (spin-off)
The Magnificent Seven * 
The Magnificent Seven (1960)
Return of the Seven (1966)
Guns of the Magnificent Seven (1969)
The Magnificent Seven Ride! (1972)
Major Mahadevan 
Keerthi Chakra (2006)
Kurukshetra (2008)
Kandahar (2010)
1971: Beyond Borders (2017)
Mandrake the Magician *
Mandrake the Magician (1939) (serial)
Mandrake the Magician (1954) (TV)
Mandrake Killing'e karsi (1967) (unauthorized turkey film)
Mandrake (1979) (TV)
Matt Helm
The Silencers (1966)
Murderers' Row (1966)
The Ambushers (1967)
The Wrecking Crew (1969)
 The Matrix
 The Matrix (1999)
 The Matrix Reloaded (2003)
 The Matrix Revolutions (2003)
 The Matrix Resurrections (2021)
McDull
My Life as McDull (2001)
McDull, Prince de la Bun (2004)
McDull, the Alumni (2006)
McDull, Kung Fu Kindergarten (2009)
Meatballs
Meatballs (1979)
Meatballs Part II (1984)
Meatballs III: Summer Job (1986)
Meatballs 4 (1992)
Mega Shark
Mega Shark Versus Giant Octopus (2009) (V)
Mega Shark Versus Crocosaurus (2010) (V) 
Mega Shark Versus Mecha Shark (2014) (V)
Mega Shark vs. Kolossus (2015) (V)
Men in Black *
Men in Black (1997)
Men in Black II (2002)
Men in Black 3 (2012)
Men in Black: International (2019)
Mickey Mouse Clubhouse * (A)
Mickey Mouse Clubhouse: Mickey Saves Santa and Other Mouseketales (2006) (V) 
Mickey Mouse Clubhouse: Mickey's Great Clubhouse Hunt (2007) (V)
Mickey Mouse Clubhouse: Mickey's Treat (2007) (V)  
Mickey Mouse Clubhouse: Mickey's Adventures in Wonderland (2009) (V)
Midnight Run
Midnight Run (1988)
Another Midnight Run (1994) (TV)
Midnight Runaround (1994) (TV)
Midnight Run for Your Life (1994) (TV)
Mike Hammer (Theatrical films)
I, the Jury (1953)
Kiss Me Deadly (1955)
My Gun Is Quick (1957)
The Girl Hunters (1963)
Min søsters børn
Min søsters børn (1966)
Min søsters børn på bryllupsrejse (1967)
Magic in Town (1968)
Kid Gang on the Go (1971)
Mirror, Mirror
Mirror, Mirror (1990)
Mirror, Mirror 2: Raven Dance (1994) (V)
Mirror, Mirror III: The Voyeur (1995)  (V)
Mirror, Mirror IV: Reflection (2000) (V)
Miss Marple, portrayed by Margaret Rutherford
Murder, She Said (1961) 
Murder at the Gallop (1963) 
Murder Most Foul (1964) 
Murder Ahoy! (1964)
Monsieur Hulot
Les vacances de Monsieur Hulot (1953) 
Mon oncle (1958) 
Play Time (1967) 
Trafic (1971)
MonsterVerse
Godzilla (2014)
Kong: Skull Island (2017)
Godzilla: King of the Monsters (2019)
Godzilla vs. Kong (2021)
Morecambe and Wise ******
The Intelligence Men (1965)
That Riviera Touch (1966)
The Magnificent Two (1967)
Night Train to Murder (1984) (TV)
Mr. Magoo ****
1001 Arabian Nights (1959)
Mr. Magoo's Christmas Carol (1962) (TV)
Uncle Sam Magoo (1970) (TV)
Kung-Fu Magoo (2010)
Multiple-Headed Shark Attack
2-Headed Shark Attack (2012) (V)
3-Headed Shark Attack (2015) (V)
5-Headed Shark Attack (2017) (TV)
6-Headed Shark Attack (2018) (TV)
The Mummy (Hammer film series)
The Mummy (1959)
The Curse of the Mummy's Tomb (1964)
The Mummy's Shroud (1966)
Blood from the Mummy's Tomb (1971)
Muni series
 Muni (2007)
 Muni 2: Kanchana (2011)
 Kanchana 2 (2015)
 Kanchana 3 (2019)
Murder 101
Murder 101 (2006) (TV)
Murder 101: College Can Be Murder (2007) (TV)
Murder 101: If Wishes Were Horses (2007) (TV)
Murder 101: Locked Room Mystery (2008) (TV) (a.k.a. Murder 101: New Age)
My Little Pony (Equestria Girls Series)
My Little Pony: Equestria Girls(2013)
Rainbow Rocks(2014)
Friendship Games(2015)
Legend of Everfree(2016)

N

Nancy Drew
Nancy Drew... Detective (1938)
Nancy Drew... Reporter (1939)
Nancy Drew... Trouble Shooter (1939)
Nancy Drew and the Hidden Staircase (1939)
Nativity
Nativity! (2009)
Danger in the Manger (2012)
Dude, Where's My Donkey? (2014)
Nativity Rocks! (2018)
Nemesis
Nemesis (1992)  
Nemesis 2: Nebula (1995) (V) 
Nemesis 3: Prey Harder (1996) (V) 
Nemesis 4: Death Angel (1996) (V)
Nemuri Kyoshirō (Masakazu Tamura series)
Nemuri Kyôshirô (1989) 
Nemuri Kyôshirô 2: Conspiracy in Edo Castle (1993) 
Nemuri Kyôshirô 3: The Man of No Tomorrow (1996) 
Nemuri Kyôshirô 4: The Woman Who Loved Kyoshiro (1998)
Night at the Museum
Night at the Museum (2006)
Night at the Museum: Battle of the Smithsonian (2009)
Night at the Museum: Secret of the Tomb (2014)
Night at the Museum: Kahmunrah Rises Again (2022)

O

 Ocean's
 Ocean's Eleven (2001)
 Ocean's Twelve (2004)
 Ocean's Thirteen (2007)
 Ocean's 8 (2018) (spin-off)
The Omen *
The Omen (1976)
Damien: Omen II (1978)
Omen III: The Final Conflict (1981)
Omen IV: The Awakening (1991) (TV)
Open Season (A)
Open Season (2006)
Open Season 2 (2008) (V)
Open Season 3 (2010) (V)
Open Season: Scared Silly (2015) (V)
Operatsiya Y i drugiye priklyucheniya Shurika
Sovershenno seryozno (1961)
Operatsiya Y i drugiye priklyucheniya Shurika (1965)
Kavkazskaya plennitsa, ili Novye priklyucheniya Shurika (1967)
Ivan Vasilevich menyaet professiyu (1973)

P

The Parent Trap
The Parent Trap (1961)
The Parent Trap II (1986) (TV)
Parent Trap III (1989) (TV)
Parent Trap: Hawaiian Honeymoon (1989) (TV)
Paul Temple
Send for Paul Temple (1946)
Calling Paul Temple (1948)
Paul Temple's Triumph (1950)
Paul Temple Returns (1952)
Peanuts (A)*
A Boy Named Charlie Brown (1969)
Snoopy Come Home (1972)
Race for Your Life, Charlie Brown (1977)
Bon Voyage, Charlie Brown (and Don't Come Back!) (1980)
Peyton Place **
Peyton Place (1957) 
Return to Peyton Place (1961)
Murder in Peyton Place (1977) (TV) 
Peyton Place: The Next Generation (1985) (TV)
Piedone
Piedone lo sbirro (1973)
Piedone a Hong Kong (1975)
Piedone l'africano (1978)
Piedone d'Egitto (1980)
Piet Piraat *
 (2005)
 (2006)
 (2008)
 (2013)
Pippi Longstocking * *
Pippi Longstocking (1969)
Pippi Goes on Board (1969)
Pippi on the Run (1970)
Pippi in the South Seas (1970)
Planet of the Apes
Rise of the Planet of the Apes (2011)
Dawn of the Planet of the Apes (2014)
War for the Planet of the Apes (2017)
Kingdom of the Planet of the Apes (2024)
Poison Ivy
Poison Ivy (1992)
Poison Ivy II: Lily (1996) (V)
Poison Ivy: The New Seduction (1997) (V)
Poison Ivy: The Secret Society (2008) (TV)
Pom Pom
Pom Pom (1984)
The Return of Pom Pom (1984)
Mr. Boo Meets Pom Pom (1985)
Pom Pom Strikes Back (1986)
Pontianak
Pontianak (1957) 
Dendam Pontianak (1957) 
Sumpah Pontianak (1958) 
Pontianak Kembali (1963)
The Prince & Me
The Prince & Me (2004)
The Prince & Me 2: The Royal Wedding (2006) (V)
The Prince & Me: A Royal Honeymoon (2008) (V)
The Prince & Me: The Elephant Adventure (2010) (V)
P.R.O.B.E.
P.R.O.B.E.: The Zero Imperative (1994) (V)
P.R.O.B.E.: The Devil of Winterborne (1995) (V)
P.R.O.B.E.: Unnatural Selection (1996) (V)
P.R.O.B.E.: Ghosts of Winterborne (1996) (V)
Project Shadowchaser
Project Shadowchaser (1992)  (V)
Project Shadowchaser II (1994)  (V)
Project Shadowchaser III (1995) (V)
Project Shadowchaser IV (1996) (a.k.a. Orion's Key) (V)
Prom Night
Prom Night (1980)
Hello Mary Lou: Prom Night II (1987)
Prom Night III: The Last Kiss (1990) (V)
Prom Night IV: Deliver Us from Evil (1992) (V)
Pumpkinhead
Pumpkinhead (1989)
Pumpkinhead II: Blood Wings (1994) (V)
Pumpkinhead: Ashes to Ashes (2006) (TV)
Pumpkinhead: Blood Feud (2007) (TV)

R

Raaz
Raaz (2002)
Raaz: The Mystery Continues (2009)
Raaz 3D (2012)
Raaz: Reboot (2016)
Rebuild of Evangelion
Evangelion: 1.0 You Are (Not) Alone (2007)
Evangelion: 2.0 You Can (Not) Advance (2009)
Evangelion: 3.0 You Can (Not) Redo (2012)
Evangelion: 3.0 + 1.0: Thrice Upon A Time (2021)
REC
REC (2007)
REC 2 (2009)
REC 3: Genesis (2012)
REC 4: Apocalypse (2014)
Relentless
Relentless (1989)
Dead On: Relentless II (1992) (V)
Relentless 3 (1993) (V)
Relentless IV: Ashes to Ashes (1994) (V)
Revenge of the Nerds
Revenge of the Nerds (1984)
Revenge of the Nerds II: Nerds in Paradise (1987)
Revenge of the Nerds III: The Next Generation (1992) (TV)
Revenge of the Nerds IV: Nerds in Love (1994) (TV)
Rise of the Footsoldier
Rise of the Footsoldier (2007)
Rise of the Footsoldier Part II: Reign of the General (2015)
Rise of the Footsoldier: The Pat Tate Story (2017) (prequel)
Rise of the Footsoldier: The Spanish Heist (2019)
Robotech *
Codename: Robotech (1985)
Robotech: The Movie (1986) (a.k.a. Robotech: The Untold Story)
Robotech II: The Sentinels (1987)
Robotech: The Shadow Chronicles (2006)
Rocket Power *
Rocket Power: Race Across New Zealand (2002) (TV)
Rocket Power: Reggie's Big (Beach) Break (2003) (TV)
Rocket Power: Island of the Menehune (2004) (TV)
Rocket Power: The Big Day (2004) (TV)
Roxy Hunter
Roxy Hunter and the Mystery of the Moody Ghost (2007) (TV) 
Roxy Hunter and the Myth of the Mermaid (2008) (TV) 
Roxy Hunter and the Secret of the Shaman (2008) (TV)
Roxy Hunter and the Horrific Halloween (2008) (TV)
 Rudolph the Red-Nosed Reindeer (Rankin/Bass series)
Rudolph the Red-Nosed Reindeer (1964)
Rudolph's Shiny New Year (1976)
Rudolph and Frosty's Christmas in July (1979)
Rudolph the Red-Nosed Reindeer and the Island of Misfit Toys (2001)

S

The Stepfather
The Stepfather (1987)
Stepfather II (1989) (V)
Stepfather III (1992) (TV)
The Stepfather (2009) (remake)
Sailor Moon ** (A)
 Sailor Moon R: The Movie (1993)
 Sailor Moon S: The Movie (1994)
 Sailor Moon Super S: The Movie (1995)
 Sailor Moon Eternal (2021)
San-Antonio
 (1966)
 (1968)
 (1981)
 (2004)

Scared Straight! *
Scared Straight! (1978)
Scared Straight! Another Story (1980)
Scared Straight! 10 Years Later (1987)
Scared Straight! 20 Years Later (1999)

The Sex Life of the Belgians
La Vie sexuelle des Belges 1950-1978 (1994) 
Camping Cosmos (1996) 
Fermeture de l'usine Renault à Vilvoorde (1998) 
La jouissance des hystériques (2000)

Shark Attack
Shark Attack (1999) (TV)
Shark Attack 2 (2000) (V)
Shark Attack 3: Megalodon (2002) (V)
Shark Zone (2003) (V) 

Sherlock Holmes, portrayed by Matt Frewer
The Hound of the Baskervilles (2000) (TV)
The Sign of Four (2001) (TV)
The Royal Scandal (2001) (TV)
The Case of the Whitechapel Vampire (2002) (TV)

The Snake King's Wife
The Snake King's Wife (1971)
The Snake King's Wife Part 2 (1973)
The Snake King's Child (2001)
The Snake King's Grandchild (2006)

The Snow Queen (A)
The Snow Queen (2012)
The Snow Queen 2 (2014)
The Snow Queen 3: Fire and Ice (2016)
The Snow Queen: Mirrorlands (2018)

Space: 1999 *
Alien Attack (1976) (TV) 
Journey Through the Black Sun (1976) (TV) 
Destination Moonbase-Alpha (1978) (TV) 
Cosmic Princess (1982) (TV)

Species
Species (1995)
Species II (1998)
Species III (2004) (TV)
Species – The Awakening (2007) (TV)

Spy Kids *
Spy Kids (2001)
Spy Kids 2: The Island of Lost Dreams (2002)
Spy Kids 3-D: Game Over (2003)
Spy Kids: All the Time in the World (2011)

Squibs
Squibs (1921)
Squibs Wins the Calcutta Sweep (1922)
Squibs M.P. (1923)
Squibs' Honeymoon (1923)

Starye pesni o glavnom
Starye pesni o glavnom (1996) (TV) 
Starye pesni o glavnom 2 (1997) (TV) 
Starye pesni o glavnom 3 (1998) (TV) 
Starye pesni o glavnom. Postskriptum (2000) (TV)

The Stepford Wives
The Stepford Wives (1975)
Revenge of the Stepford Wives (1980) (TV)
The Stepford Children (1987) (TV)
The Stepford Husbands (1996) (TV)

Sten Stensson Steen
 (1945) 
 (1946) 
 (1955) 
 (1963)

Stompa
 (1962) 
 (1963) 
 (1965) 
 (1967)

The Stranger
Un dollaro tra i denti (1967)
Un uomo, un cavallo, una pistola (1967)
Lo straniero di silenzio (1968)
Get Mean (1976)

Strawberry Shortcake * (A)
Strawberry Shortcake: The Sweet Dreams Movie (2006) (V)
Strawberry Shortcake: Berry Blossom Festival (2007) (V)
Strawberry Shortcake: Let's Dance (2007) (V)
Strawberry Shortcake: Rockaberry Roll (2008) (V)

Street Fighter * (Anime series)
Street Fighter II: The Animated Movie (1995)
Street Fighter Alpha: The Movie (1999) (V)
Street Fighter Alpha: Generations (2005) (V)
Street Fighter IV: The Ties That Bind (2009) (V)

Subspecies
Subspecies (1991)
Bloodstone: Subspecies II (1993) (V)
Bloodlust: Subspecies III (1994) (V)
Subspecies 4: Bloodstorm (1998) (V)

The Substitute
The Substitute (1996)
The Substitute 2: School's Out (1998) (V)
The Substitute 3: Winner Takes All (1999) (V)
The Substitute: Failure Is Not an Option (2001) (V)

Super Giant
Atomic Rulers of the World (1965) (TV) (a.k.a. Atomic Rulers)
Invaders from Space (1965) (TV) 
Attack from Space (1965) (TV) 
Evil Brain from Outer Space (1965) (TV)

Super Fly
Super Fly (1972)
Super Fly T.N.T. (1973)
The Return of Superfly (1990)
Superfly (2018)

Supernasen
 (1982)
Die Supernasen (1983)
 (1984)
 (1985)

T

Taboo American Style
Taboo American Style 1 (1985) 
Taboo American Style 2 (1985)
Taboo American Style 3 (1985) 
Taboo American Style 4 (1985)
Tailspin Tommy
Mystery Plane (1939) 
Stunt Pilot (1939) 
Sky Patrol (1939) 
Danger Flight (1939)
Tammy *
Tammy and the Bachelor (1957)
Tammy Tell Me True (1961) 
Tammy and the Doctor (1963) 
Tammy and the Millionaire (1967)
 Teen Titans Go! *
 Teen Titans Go! To the Movies (2018)
 Teen Titans Go! vs. Teen Titans (2019) (V)
 Teen Titans Go! See Space Jam (2021) (TV)
 Teen Titans Go! & DC Super Hero Girls: Mayhem in the Multiverse (2022) (V)
 Teenage Mutant Ninja Turtles * (1990 series)
 Teenage Mutant Ninja Turtles (1990)
 Teenage Mutant Ninja Turtles II: The Secret of the Ooze (1991)
 Teenage Mutant Ninja Turtles III (1993)
 TMNT (2007) (A)
Tesna koža
Tesna koža (1982)
Tesna koza 2 (1987) 
Tesna koza 3 (1988)  
Tesna koza 4 (1991)
A Thief on the Night
A Thief in the Night (1972)
A Distant Thunder (1978)
Image of the Beast (1980)
The Prodigal Planet (1983)
 The Three Musketeers (Michael York as D'Artagnan)
 The Three Musketeers (1973)
 The Four Musketeers (1974)
 The Return of the Musketeers (1989)
 La Femme Musketeer (2004) (TV)
The Three Musketeers (1978 series)
d'Artagnan and Three Musketeers (1978)
Musketeers Twenty Years After (1992)
The Secret of Queen Anne or Musketeers Thirty Years After (1993)
The Return of the Musketeers, or The Treasures of Cardinal Mazarin (2007)
Tiny Times
 Tiny Times (2013)
 Tiny Times 2 (2013)
 Tiny Times 3 (2014)
 Tiny Times 4 (2015)
Toho Space Opera series
The Mysterians (1957)
Battle in Outer Space (1959)
Gorath (1963)
The War in Space (1977)
Tom Lepski
Try This One for Size (Sauf votre respect) (1989)
Have a Nice Night (Passez une bonne nuit) (1990)
Want to Stay Alive (Le denier du colt) (1990)
 (Présumé dangereux) (1990)
La Noche del terror ciego (Tombs of the Blind Dead)
La Noche del terror ciego (Tombs of the Blind Dead) (1971)
El Ataque de los muertos sin ojos (Return of the Blind Dead) (1973)
El Buque maldito (The Ghost Galleon) (1974)
La Noche de las gaviotas (Night of the Seagulls) (1975)
The Toxic Avenger *
The Toxic Avenger (1985)
The Toxic Avenger Part II (1989)
The Toxic Avenger Part III: The Last Temptation of Toxie (1989)
Citizen Toxie: The Toxic Avenger IV (2000)
 Transporter *
 The Transporter (2002)
 Transporter 2 (2005)
 Transporter 3 (2008)
 The Transporter: Refueled (2015)
Tuntematon sotilas
Tuntematon sotilas (1955) 
Täällä Pohjantähden alla (1968) 
Akseli ja Elina (1970) 
Täällä Pohjantähden alla II (2010)

U

Unauthorized series
The Unauthorized Saved by the Bell Story (2014) (TV) 
The Unauthorized Full House Story (2015) (TV) 
The Unauthorized Beverly Hills, 90210 Story (2015) (TV) 
The Unauthorized Melrose Place Story (2015) (TV) 
Undisputed
Undisputed (2002)
Undisputed II: Last Man Standing (2007) (V)
Undisputed III: Redemption (2010) (V)
Boyka: Undisputed (2017) (V)
Ultus (serials)
Ultus, the Man from the Dead (1916) 
Ultus and the Grey Lady (1916) 
Ultus and the Secret of the Night (1916) 
Ultus and the Three-Button Mystery (1917)

V

La Vérité Si Je Mens! (1997)
 (2001)
 (2012)
 (2019) (prequel)
Violent Shit
Violent Shit (1989) (V)
Violent Shit II: Mother Hold My Hand (1992) (V)
Violent Shit III: Infantry of Doom (1999) (V)
Karl the Butcher vs. Axe (2010) (V)
V/H/S
V/H/S (2012)
V/H/S/2 (2013)
V/H/S: Viral (2014)
Siren (2016) (spin-off)
Les Visiteurs
 Les Visiteurs (1993)
 The Visitors II: The Corridors of Time (1998)
 The Visitors: Bastille Day (2016)
 Just Visiting (2001)

W

Voyna i mir
Voyna i mir I: Andrey Bolkonskiy (1965) 
Voyna i mir II: Natasha Rostova (1966) 
Voyna i mir III: 1812 god (1967) 
Voyna i mir IV: Pierre Bezukhov (1967)
Watchers
Watchers (1988)
Watchers II (1990)
Watchers 3 (1994)
Watchers Reborn (1998)
What Price Glory
What Price Glory (1926)
The Cock-Eyed World (1929)
Women of All Nations (1931)
Hot Pepper (1933)
White Fang (1974 series) *
Challenge to White Fang (1974)
White Fang to the Rescue (1974)
White Fang and the Gold Diggers (1974)
White Fang and the Hunter (1975)
Wild Bill Saunders
The Taming of the West (1939) 
Pioneers of the Frontier (1940) 
The Man from Tumbleweeds (1940) 
The Return of Wild Bill (1940)
Wild Things
 Wild Things (1998)
 Wild Things 2 (2004) (V)
 Wild Things: Diamonds in the Rough (2005) (V)
 Wild Things: Foursome (2010) (V)
Windstorm
Windstorm (2013)
 (2015)
 (2017)
 (2019)
Wishmaster
Wishmaster (1997)
Wishmaster 2: Evil Never Dies (1999) (TV)
Wishmaster 3: Beyond the Gates of Hell (2001) (V)
Wishmaster: The Prophecy Fulfilled (2002) (V)
 Witch Mountain *
 Escape to Witch Mountain (1975)
 Return from Witch Mountain (1978)
 Beyond Witch Mountain (1982) (TV)
 Race to Witch Mountain (2009)

Z

 Zoey 101 
 Zoey 101: Spring Break-Up (2006) (TV)
 Zoey 101: The Curse of PCA (2007) (TV)
 Zoey 101: Goodbye Zoey? (2008) (TV)
 Zoey 101: Chasing Zoey (2008) (TV)
 Zombi
 Zombi 2 (1979)
 Zombi 3 (1987)
 Killing Birds (1987)
 After Death (1988)

04
^